Pompilus is a genus of spider wasps in the family Pompilidae, the members of which prey on spiders.  There are seven species recognised in Pompilus sensu stricto.  It is the type genus of the family Pompilidae and the subfamily Pompilinae.

Biology
Pompilus wasps are fossorial, stocking short burrows in sand with single spiders of various families upon which they lay a single egg.

Distribution
The members of Pompilus are widely distributed throughout the Old World, in both temperate and tropical regions, but with the greatest diversity in Africa.

The species are:
Pompilus 3-punctatus Spinola, 1808
Pompilus accolens Cresson, 1869
Pompilus cinereus (Fabricius, 1775) leaden spider wasp
Pompilus mirandus (Saussure, 1867)
Pompilus cadmius Saussure, 1892
Pompilus bilineatus (Arnold 1937)
Pompilus botswana Day, 1972
Pompilus irpex Gerstaecker, 1858
Pompilus niveus Saunders, 1901

References

Hymenoptera genera
Pompilinae